The Italian team at the running events represents Italy at senior level at the road running (marathon, half marathon), racewalking, cross country running and track long-distance running (10,000 metres) events, such as World championships, World of European Cups.

Medals

World Marathon Cup

World Half Marathon Championships

World Cross Country Championships
In italic the participants whose result did not go into the team's total scoring points, but awarded with medals.

World Race Walking Team Championships

From 1975 to 1997 was awarded Lugano Trophy for combined team (20K + 50K). Since 1993 the medals have been awarded for the single events of the 20K and 50K teams, therefore in the 1993, 1995 and 1997 editions three team medals were assigned, from 1999 the combined was abolished and the team medals remained two until the present day.

Multiple medalists

Below are the medals won by the Italian team, therefore the medals won in the individual competition are excluded.

European Marathon Cup
In italic the participants whose result did not go into the team's total scoring points (first three athletes), but awarded with medals from 1994, before the score was calculated summing the placings of the first 4 classified who were the only awarded with medal.

European Half Marathon Cup
In italic the participants whose result did not go into the team's total time, but awarded with medals

European Cross Country Championships
In italic the participants whose result did not go into the team's total time, but awarded with medals.

European Race Walking Cup

In italic the participants whose result did not go into the team's total time, but awarded with medals.

Multiple medalists
Below are the medals won by the Italian team, therefore the medals won in the individual competition are excluded.

European 10,000m Cup

Individual medals

Team medals
Legend: in italic the athletes whose time was not scored in the team rankings, because the first three classifieds of each nation their time is added up. In any case, the medals were awarded to the participants, although they did not finish the race.

Multiple medalists
Below are the medals won by the Italian team, therefore the medals won in the individual competition are excluded.

See also
 Italy national athletics team
 Italian national track relay team

References

External links
 EAA web site
 IAAF web site

Running events